Pygmaeconus visseri is a species of sea snail, a marine gastropod mollusk in the family Conidae, the cone snails and their allies.

Like all species within the genus Conus, these snails are predatory and venomous. They are capable of "stinging" humans, therefore live ones should be handled carefully or not at all.

Description
The size of the shell attains 8 mm.

Distribution
This marine species was found off Phuket Island, Thailand

References

 Delsaerdt, A. 1990. Conus visseri a new species from Phuket Island. Note on Conus coffeae Gmelin, 1791. Gloria Maris 29(1):1–4, figs. 1–10
 
 Filmer R.M. (2001). A Catalogue of Nomenclature and Taxonomy in the Living Conidae 1758 - 1998. Backhuys Publishers, Leiden. 388pp

External links
 The Conus Biodiversity website
 
 Puillandre N. & Tenorio M.J. (2017). A question of rank: DNA sequences and radula characters reveal a new genus of cone snails (Gastropoda: Conidae). Journal of Molluscan Studies. 83(2): 200–210
 

visseri
Gastropods described in 1990